OPD may refer to:

Police departments
 Oakland Police Department, a U.S. law enforcement agency in California
 Omaha Police Department, a U.S. law enforcement agency in Nebraska
 Orlando Police Department, a U.S. law enforcement agency in Florida

Other uses
 o-phenylenediamine, a chemical compound
 Object Process Diagram, in object oriented programming
 One Per Desk, a 1980s personal computer and telecommunications terminal
 Optical path difference
 Organizational Process Definition
 Outpatient department, part of a hospital 
 Overfill Protection Device, a safety mechanism incorporated in the valves of propane cylinders
 Pico dos Dias Observatory, a Brazilian astronomical observatory
 Office of Public Diplomacy, a US propaganda agency during the Reagan era
 Organic personality disorder

See also
OPDS (disambiguation)